The Chicago Boosters were an Independent American football team that played two seasons from 1920 to 1921. They played in one APFA game.

1920

The team was founded in 1920, starting the season with a tie against the Green Bay Packers. Their second game's score is unknown. Their third game was a 0–0 tie against the Chicago Amos A.A. They ended up playing 15 games in 1920. Their record was 7-1-6 (excluding their second game which had an unknown score). Their only game against an APFA opponent was a 27–0 win over the Hammond Pros. They used three different home stadiums in 1920; they played in Harrison Tech Field, DePaul Field, and Logan Square Park.

1921

They opened the 1921 season with a 13–0 loss against the Green Bay Packers. They then had a 3–0 win over the Moline Indians. They finished the 1921 season with a 4-2-3 record. The 1921 season was their last.

References

American football teams established in 1920
American football teams disestablished in 1921